The Westchester Square–East Tremont Avenue station (formerly Westchester Square station) is a local station on the IRT Pelham Line of the New York City Subway. Located at the intersection of East Tremont and Westchester Avenues in Westchester Square, Bronx, it is served by the 6 train at all times except weekdays in the peak direction, when the <6> train takes over.


Station layout 

This elevated station has three tracks and two side platforms. The center track is not used in regular service.

The street staircase features a stained glass piece by Romare Bearden. There are glass block tile and "uptown" and "downtown" directional mosaics in the mezzanine. From the northbound platform, there is a good view of the Bronx–Whitestone and Throgs Neck Bridges. Westchester Yard is located railroad north of the station, to the west of the Pelham Line itself. There are no windscreens, and the canopy is new. The mezzanine artwork features an interesting geometric sculpture on the northbound side.

In 1981, the MTA listed the station among the 69 most deteriorated stations in the subway system. Under the 2015–2019 MTA Capital Program, the station, along with thirty other New York City Subway stations, will undergo a complete overhaul and would be entirely closed for up to 6 months. Updates would include cellular service, Wi-Fi, charging stations, improved signage, and improved station lighting. However, these renovations are being deferred until the 2020–2024 Capital Program due to a lack of funding. As part of a revision to the Capital Program in April 2018, elevators will be installed at this station and it will become ADA-accessible. , funding had been committed to accessibility renovations at the Westchester Square station. In December 2021, the MTA awarded a contract for the installation of elevators at eight stations, including the Westchester Square station. , the project is scheduled to be completed in May 2024.

Exit
The station's only exit is a mezzanine beneath the tracks in Westchester Square. Outside fare control, a stair leads to the northeast corner of Westchester Avenue and Lane Avenue.

Nearby points of interest 
 Herbert H. Lehman High School
 Huntington Free Library and Reading Room
 Montefiore Medical Center
 St. Peter's Church, Chapel and Cemetery Complex
 Westchester Creek

References

External links 

 
 nycsubway.org — City of Light Artwork by Romare Bearden (1993)
 nycsubway.org — Unknown Artwork (unknown artist and date)
 Station Reporter — 6 Train
 The Subway Nut — Westchester Square–East Tremont Avenue Pictures
 MTA's Arts For Transit — Westchester Square–East Tremont Avenue (IRT Pelham Line)
 Westchester Square entrance from Google Maps Street View

IRT Pelham Line stations
Railway and subway stations on the National Register of Historic Places in New York City
New York City Subway stations in the Bronx
Railway stations in the United States opened in 1920
1920 establishments in New York City
National Register of Historic Places in the Bronx
Westchester Square, Bronx